Waterballs are water toys that are played on the water surface with players interacting with the water toy and the water in any number of play patterns. Generally players throw waterballs at varying speeds across the water and air at varying angles to get the desired skip pattern. Play is generally between players and play patterns can involve a variety of apparatus and equipment, such as special pools with goals and watercourts.

In popular culture
They are palm-sized waterballs that can travel as fast as they can be thrown. They can travel a great distance, even crossing large moving waterways. High-performance waterballs currently are not well known to the public as they have only been on the US market for a few years, having been introduced in the summer of 2008 with the launch of the Waboba Ball.

Splash balls or water bombs are well known to the public and have been on the market in the US for years. They are designed for children and adults to play on a water surface. These are also more suitable for children and non-sport uses. Splash balls or water bombs are not high-performance waterballs or part of this discussion.

There are a number of nerf-styled polo waterballs on the market that are smaller and softer than the regulation sport polo waterball. These are also more suitable for children and non-sport uses. These are polo and catch balls designed to play on the water surface however they are not high-performance waterballs or part of this discussion.

Generally, high-performance waterballs have little friction on the water, they are relatively small in size and density making them generally a handball size. With a certain amount of force they skip, bounce and glide in a straight line on the water surface and can travel fast and long distance. They can be projected on the water between players at a range of 3– 200 feet as there is very little friction slow them on the water surface – particularly the sealed waterball. Each time they bounce, skip or roll on the water surface, the inertia is reduced by opposing forces of gravity, friction, surface tension, surface drag.

Waterballs have traditionally been seen as a children's toy, with a number of manufacturers aiming for that particular market segment when introducing new products. The WaterRipper is being marketed as a kid's 4+ pool toy however it is also marketed as a high-performance action sports water ball. Most waterballs are sold in sporting goods, toy stores, outdoor stores and even food stores. The WaterRipper was launched in the United States in July 2010. The Waboba ball was initially marketed overseas, introduced in Scandinavia 2005 and in the United Kingdom in 2008. It is now sold worldwide.

Size, shape and materials
The high-performance waterball is generally the size of a golf ball or stress ball designed for catching with a single hand. Different waterballs are made of different materials. Most high-performance waterballs are sealed balls and are made out of different types of rubber or neoprene with gel material center and polyurethane and Lycra jacket. The new generation waterball is water absorbing with fluid high-density particulate contents. There are patent pending designs for "high density" or "balanced density " materials in making the new generation waterballs.

High-performance waterballs come in different sizes and shapes. There are a handful of high-performance waterballs such as Waboba Ball, Water Bouncer, and the WaterRipper currently sold in the US. The sealed or water-absorbing, high-performance waterballs are typically  or larger and made of soft rubber generally with a neoprene single seam jacket. These balls are designed to bounce on the water surface.

The water absorbing waterball is the smallest of these high-performance waterballs. It is a collapsing bag or sack like a footbag with an Ultra Suede single seam cover and beaded fill with other water absorbing high-density materials. It is designed to skip and roll on water in a low profile skip pattern. It looks and feels like a footbag or Hacky Sack. The water absorbing waterball like the Waboba Blast Ball and Water Ripper Ball are the only high-performance waterballs designed to absorb water.

Sealed waterballs vs. absorbent waterballs

There are actually two types of high-performance waterballs. While all waterballs float on water, there are some that absorb water and others that are sealed. Sealed waterballs generally bounce higher because they simply repel & displace water. This type of waterball requires the players to have a grip or "timed grab" to catch the ball in flight and stop it. Because they bounce, they are generally hard to catch and often require two hands or a mitt or glove to control or catch them and more suited for adult play.

Conversely, the water absorbing collapsing waterball or waterbag is generally caught with one hand. Because it collapses on impact on the water or in your hand, it is easier and safer to play with young children ages 4+.

A sealed ball displaces and bounces on water as it interacts with the water surface. On impact with the water surface or a player's hand, the sealed waterball deforms and deflects and transfers its energy in the opposite direction as it bounces on impact. But a sealed waterball no matter how soft still maintains its spherical shape and ball like properties. The fluid dynamics and shape characteristics are relatively unchanged as the sealed waterball does not change its density.

As such, even tennis balls and handballs, stress balls can be used as waterball and perform, admitted poorly, depending on force and angle to the water etc.

Water absorbing waterballs or technically "waterbags", on the other hand, are designed for water and density exchange. Water freely permeates the whole ball, adding more weight and dynamic fluid density. The added weight makes this type of waterball skip and roll on water, rather than bounce. As a result, water absorbing high-performance waterballs travel shorter distances than sealed waterballs but they are easier to control and play with both in long and short range.

A waterbag exchanges its fluid density and transforms and conforms its shape and fluid contents on impact with a surface or plain. On impact with a surface such as water, the waterbag dissipates its energy dynamically as it interacts with the water surface exchanging fluid contents. This changes and balances the bag's density, mass and shape to conform to the water or surface it is performing on as it loses its velocity and comes to rest.

The beanbag-like design of the waterbag changes shape and conforms to a surface thus it collapses and is "slow acting" on impact. There is a significant difference between the physics of the sealed waterball and the water absorbing waterball or waterbag.

The waterbag exchanges its fluid contents on impact and it changes its shape as it collapses on impact. There is no bouncing or minimal bouncing action. Slow acting on impact is an intended design characteristic that is very pleasing and safe in high-speed play action. The "rolling action" of the waterbag that is referred to a "low skip profile" on the water surface that again collapses on impact with the water surface or player's hand. This makes the waterbag less active and easier to catch. The waterbag is both fast in action and slow acting on impact.

Safety issues
Most waterballs currently available, while perfectly functional in water, are not designed to work well on a hard surface. This is particularly true with the new generation waterbag design.
Also, the impact of a waterball can hurt, and some waterballs have marks left on their skin.
However, there are several balls that address these issues by using softer and lighter material.
They have a low skip pattern and they are easy to catch and stay in the pool. Water absorbing waterbag designs are also designed in a way that makes them suitable for play in pools.

References

Ball games
Water sports
Water toys